Killashee is a village in County Longford, Ireland.

Sport
Killashee is home to St. Brigid's Killashee GAA, the team currently competes in the Longford Intermediate Football Championship. Killashee has produced some inter-county players through the years. Killashee had an international player who represented Ireland in the Shinty-Hurling International Series in 2018.

Location and transport
The village is situated along the N63 road between Claregalway and Longford and is 8 kilometres south of Longford town. The closest airport to the Killashee is the Abbeyshrule Aerodrome located 33 kilometres south-east of the village, the closest major airport is Knock Airport in Charlestown, County Mayo, 91 kilometres north-west of Killashee.

Killashee is served by two Bus Éireann routes. Route 425 provides a weekday service each way to/from Galway via Lanesboro and Roscommon. Route 467 provides two journeys each way to Longford and Lanesboro on Wednesday.

See also
 List of towns and villages in Ireland

References

Towns and villages in County Longford